The women's 800 metres event at the 1999 All-Africa Games was held at the Johannesburg Stadium.

Medalists

Results

Heats
Qualification: First 2 of each heat (Q) and the next 2 fastest (q) qualified for the final.

Final

References

800